Emanuele Manzi (born 25 October 1977) is an Italian male mountain runner, who won a medal at individual senior level  at the World Mountain Running Championships.

See also
 Italy at the World Mountain Running Championships
 Italy at the European Mountain Running Championships

References

External links
 

1977 births
Living people
Italian male long-distance runners
Italian male mountain runners
Place of birth missing (living people)
21st-century Italian people